The following are lists of mountains in New Zealand ordered by height. Names, heights, topographic prominence and isolation, and coordinates were extracted from the official Land Information New Zealand (LINZ) Topo50 topographic maps at the interactive topographic map of New Zealand site.

Mountains are referred to as maunga in the Māori language.

Named summits over 2,900 m
Some of these summits are mere shoulders on the ridges of Aoraki and Mount Tasman.

The 100 highest mountains
Five peaks overlooked on that list are indicated with an asterisk. Of these 100 mountains, all but two — Ruapehu (Tahurangi Peak) (19th highest) and Mount Taranaki / Egmont (65th highest) — are in the South Island. Tapuae-o-Uenuku, in the Kaikoura Ranges, is the highest peak outside the Southern Alps.

Other notable mountains and hills

Over 2,000 metres
Te Heuheu – - highest peak in the north of the crater rim of Mount Ruapehu
Mount Strauchon – 
Mount Bonpland – 
Turner Peak – 
Mount Franklin (Tasman) – 
Mount Travers – 
Mount Taylor – 
Double Cone – 
Mount Tūwhakarōria – 
Somnus – 
Mount Ngauruhoe – 
Mount Hopeless – 
Mount Rolleston – 
Mount Aurum – 
Faerie Queen – 
Mount Paske – 
Mount Adams – 
Mount Awful – 
Mount Hutt – 
Mount Franklin (Canterbury) – 
Mount Cloudsley – 
Mount Olympus – 
Dobson Peak – 
David Peaks – 
Mount Macfarlane – 
Tooth Peak – 
Damfool – 
Mount Dreadful – 
Jane Peak –

1,000 to 2,000 metres
Castle Hill Peak – 
Mount Tongariro – 
Cecil Peak – 
Mount Pisa – 
Mount Cardrona – 
Mount Ollivier – 
Benmore Peak (Benmore Range) –  (site of Benmore Peak Observatory)
Mount Owen – 
Sutherlands Peak (Benmore Range) – 
Totara Peak (Benmore Range) – 
Walter Peak – 
Mount Arthur – 
Mount Hikurangi (Gisborne District) –  (highest peak in the North Island, excluding volcanoes)
Ben Lomond – 
Mount Peel – 
Mount Mangaweka –  (second highest peak in the North Island, excluding volcanoes)
Kaweka J (Kaweka Range) – 
Mount Axford – 
Brown Peak, Sturge Island (subantarctic island) –  or 
Mount Winterslow – 
Mitre Peak – 
Mount Somers / Te Kiekie – 
Purple Hill (Lake Pearson, above Waimakariri Valley) – 
Mount Pisgah –  (highest peak of the Kakanui Range)
Roys Peak – 
The Mitre (Tararua Range) – 
Mount Hector (Tararua Range) – 
Angle Knob (Tararua Range) – 
Hauhungatahi – 
Mount Lyndon – 
Mid Dome – 
Mount Luxmore – 
Mount Holdsworth (Tararua Range) – 
The Cairn (Benmore Range) – 
Summit Peak –  (highest point of the Rock and Pillar Range)
Mount Arowhana – 
Jumbo Peak (Tararua Range) – 
Pouakai (Pouakai Range) – 
Mount Alfred – 
Mount Oxford – 
Young Island (subantarctic island) – 
Mount Isobel (Hanmer, South Island) – 
The Buscot (Benmore Range) – 
Buckle Island (subantarctic island) – 
Mount Noble – 
Mount Te Kinga – 
Mount Grono (Secretary Island) –  (highest peak in main New Zealand chain not in the North or South Island)
Mount Pureora – 
Mount Tarawera – 
Mount Tauhara – 
Mount John –  (site of Mount John University Observatory)
Mount Thomas –

Under 1,000 metres
Mount Ross –  (highest point in the Aorangi Range)
Mount Anglem –  (highest peak on Stewart Island/Rakiura)
Mount Pirongia – 
Mount Te Aroha –  (highest point in the Kaimai Range)
Mount Matthews –  (highest peak in Rimutaka Range)
Mount Herbert (Te Ahu Patiki) –  (highest point on Banks Peninsula)
Wharite Peak – 
Queenstown Hill – 
Maungatua – 
Moehau –  (highest point on the Coromandel Peninsula)
Mount Graham – 
Mount Edgecumbe (Putauaki) – 
Maungatautari –  (site of the Maungatautari Restoration Project)
Te Raupua –  (highest point in Northland)
Tutamoe –  (second highest point in Northland)
Tākaka Hill – 
Mount Ngongotahā – 
Mount Karioi –  (overlooks Raglan)
Swampy Summit –  (highest remnant of the Dunedin Volcano)
Mount Hauturu on Little Barrier Island –  (highest point in the Auckland Region)
Mount Wainui –  (highest peak in Akatarawa Forest)
Mount Pye –  (highest point in The Catlins)
Mount McKerrow – 
Mount Dick (highest point in the Auckland Islands, on Adams Island) – 
Kohukohunui (highest point in the Hunua Ranges) – 
Patuha (New Zealand) (highest point in the Kaitake Range) – 
Mount Cargill – 
Flagstaff (Dunedin) – 
Mount Clime – 
Kahuranaki –  Hawkes Bay Region
Mount Hikurangi (Northland) – 
Mount Hobson (highest point on Great Barrier Island) – 
Hokonui Hills – 
Mount Honey (Campbell Island) – 
Mount Karangahake (Hauraki District – 
Castle Rock in the Coromandel Range – 
Moumoukai –  (highest point in the Kermadec Islands, on Raoul Island)
Hawkins Hill, Wellington – 
Te Heru o Kahukura / Sugarloaf (Christchurch) – 
Kohinurākau (Hastings) – 
Te Toiokawharu (highest point in the Waitākere Ranges) – 
Saddle Hill (Dunedin) – 
Rangituhi / Colonial Knob (Porirua, Wellington) – 
Kakepuku (Waikato, North Island) – 
Mount Kaukau (Wellington) – 
Ruaotuwhenua (Waitākere Ranges, Auckland) – 
Mount Charles –  (highest point on the Otago Peninsula)
Mount Manaia (Whangarei) – 
Te Mata Peak (Hastings) – 
Signal Hill (Dunedin) – 
Mayor Island / Tuhua – 
Pukematekeo (Waitākere Ranges, Auckland) – 
Whakaari / White Island – 
Taumatawhakatangihangakoauauotamateapokaiwhenuakitanatahu – 
Te Ahumairangi – 
Brooklyn Hill (Wellington) – 
Maungatere Hill –  (highest named point in the Chatham Islands)
Mangere –  (highest point on Mangere Island)
Bluff Hill / Motupohue ("The Bluff", Bluff, Southland) – 
Rangitoto Island – 
Maunganui (Waiheke Island) -  
Mount Maunganui – 
Mount Victoria, Wellington – 
Mount Eden (Auckland) – 
One Tree Hill (Auckland) – 
Paritutu (New Plymouth) – 
Mount Wellington (Auckland) – 
Mount Albert (Auckland) – 
Roys Hill (Hastings) – 
Mount Roskill (Auckland) – 
Mangere Mountain – 
Bluff Hill (Napier) –

Notes

External links

Mountains of New Zealand published by the New Zealand Alpine Club

New Zealand
Mountains
New Zealand
New Zealand